Goswin was a Benedictine abbot. Born in Douai in 1082, then in the County of Flanders and since 1668 in France, he studied in Paris and afterwards returned to Douai to teach theology. Goswin then entered Anchin Abbey in 1113, in Pecquencourt, near his hometown, and became a Benedictine monk. In 1130 he was made abbot of Anchin Abbey.

Goswin died of natural causes in 1165 at Pecquencourt.

References

1082 births
1165 deaths
12th-century Christian saints
Benedictine abbots
Flemish Christian monks
French Benedictines
12th-century people from the county of Flanders

de:Goswin von Anchin
fr:Gossuin d'Anchin